Edward Barradall (c. 1703–1743) was a British attorney, admiralty judge and politician who represented the College of William and Mary in the House of Burgesses, and compiled the first volume of decisions of the general Court of the Colony of Virginia.

Early and family life
Born in England to Henry Barradall and his wife Catherine Blumfield, who had married in 1676, Barradell studied law and was admitted to the bar at the Inner Temple.

On January 5, 1736, in Virginia, Barradell married Sarah, the daughter and granddaughter of planters named William FitzHugh, and sister of Burgess William Fitzhugh. They had a son, Edward Barradall, Jr., orphaned as a child but who reached adulthood and had children.

Career

Barradall emigrated from England with his two brothers and sisters to the Colony of Virginia. He developed a successful legal practice in Williamsburg and Lord Fairfax, who had vast land claims sometimes known as the Northern Neck Proprietary was one of his clients. Barradell succeeded John Clayton as the Attorney General of Virginia in 1737. 

That same year, Sir John Randolph who represented the College of William and Mary in the House of Burgesses (and was also its Speaker) died, and Barradell succeeded him as burgess for the next sessions, until his death. Barradell also served as Judge of the Admiralty Court. and mayor of Williamsburg, Virginia (1736-1737).

Edward Barradall is sometimes called Virginia's first law reporter, for a manuscript of his notes concerning cases adjudicated by the General Court of Virginia between April 1733 and October 1741 was published long after his death, although the original manuscript is now lost.

In 1739 one of Barradall's indentured servants, John Davis, a West Country man imported from Bristol, ran away, so Barradall advertised for his return, noting that since he had lived in Philadelphia he might be trying to run back there. He offered a cash reward and a pistol for Davis' return.

Death
Barradall died about 1743 in Virginia, as did his wife Sarah. Both are buried together in the same tomb in the churchyard of historic Bruton Parish Church in Williamsburg.

References 

1703 births
1743 deaths
Fitzhugh family of Virginia
Mayors of Williamsburg, Virginia
Virginia lawyers
Virginia Attorneys General
American people of English descent
House of Burgesses members